Ashgabat Cable Car is a  cableway between Ashgabat and the foothills of the Kopetdag. It is the first and only cable car in Turkmenistan. Construction was finished on 18 October 2006.

History 
Construction was started in 2005. Object constructed by the French company Bouygues. The project cost $20,5 million. The customer is concern Turkmenenergogurlushyk of the Ministry of Energy and Industry of Turkmenistan. Construction went 2 years.

Inaugurated on 18 October 2006 with the participation of the President of Turkmenistan Saparmurat Niyazov and the head of the company Bouygues Martin Bouygues.

Specification 
The cable car can accommodate 300 passengers simultaneously, totaling 1,700 riders per day. Each of the 14 cabins accommodate up to 8 people. The journey time is 10 minutes. The velocity of 16 cabins — 6 meters per second. Passengers are carried out every 72 seconds. Length of the cable car — 4 km.

Sending station is located south of the Main Museum of Turkmenistan at an altitude of 1270 meters above sea level. The station has a waiting room and ticket office, facilities for technical services and equipment. On an area of 6500 square meters is a small park and is equipped with parking for 100 cars and 5 buses. In addition to the arrival station, constructed building with a total area of over 1,000 square meters, which houses two restaurants and cafes, which both can take 280 people, several shops and offices for staff. The neighborhood and set up a sightseeing helicopter pad, covered terraces and stairways, alleys and water cascade length of 80 meters.

References

Aerial tramways
Tourist attractions in Turkmenistan
Tourist attractions in Ashgabat
2006 establishments in Turkmenistan